Eberhard Weber (born 22 January 1940, in Stuttgart, Germany) is a German double bassist and composer. As a bass player, he is known for his highly distinctive tone and phrasing. Weber's compositions blend chamber jazz, European classical music, minimalism and ambient music, and are regarded as characteristic examples of the ECM Records sound.

Biography

Weber began recording in the early 1960s, and released The Colours of Chloë (ECM 1042), his first record under his own name, in 1973. In addition to his career as a musician, he also worked for many years as a television and theater director. He has designed an electric-acoustic bass with an additional string tuned to C.

Weber's music, often in a melancholic tone, frequently utilizes ostinatos, yet is highly organized in its colouring and attention to detail. He was an early proponent of the solid-body electric double bass, which he has played regularly since the early 1970s.

From the early 1960s to the early 1970s, Weber's closest musical association was with pianist Wolfgang Dauner. Their many mutual projects were diverse, from mainstream jazz to jazz-rock fusion to avant-garde sound experiments. During this period, Weber also played and recorded with pianists Hampton Hawes and Mal Waldron, guitarists Baden Powell de Aquino and Joe Pass, The Mike Gibbs Orchestra, violinist Stephane Grappelli, and many others.

Starting with The Colours of Chloë, Weber has released 13 more records under his own name, all on ECM. The ECM association also led to collaborations with other ECM recording artists such as Gary Burton (Ring, 1974; Passengers, 1976), Ralph Towner (Solstice, 1975; Solstice/Sound and Shadows, 1977), Pat Metheny (Watercolors, 1977), and Jan Garbarek (10 recordings between 1978 and 1998).

In the mid-1970s Weber formed his own group, Colours, with Charlie Mariano (soprano saxophone, flutes), Rainer Brüninghaus (piano, synthesizer) and Jon Christensen (drums). After their first recording, Yellow Fields (1975), Christensen left and was replaced by John Marshall. The group toured extensively and recorded two further records, Silent Feet (1977) and Little Movements (1980), before disbanding.

Since the early 1980s, Weber has regularly collaborated with the British singer-songwriter Kate Bush, playing on four of her last six studio albums (The Dreaming, 1982; Hounds of Love, 1985; The Sensual World, 1989; Aerial, 2005).

During the 1980s, Weber toured with Barbara Thompson's jazz ensemble Paraphernalia.

Since 1990, Weber's touring has been limited, and he has had only two new recordings under his own name: The 2001 release Endless Days is an elemental fusion of jazz and classical music flavors, fitting well the moniker chamber jazz. His main touring activity during that period was as a regular member of the Jan Garbarek Group. On the occasion of his 65th birthday, in March, 2005 he recorded  Stages of a Long Journey, a live concert with the Stuttgart Radio Symphony Orchestra and featuring Gary Burton, Wolfgang Dauner and Jan Garbarek. In 2009 ECM also re-released his albums Yellow Fields, Silent Feet and Little Movements as a 3-CD collection titled "Colours".

In 2007, Weber suffered a stroke and was subsequently unable to perform. In a January 2010 interview with Die Welt, he spoke about his medical condition and future projects.

Weber was awarded the prestigious Albert Mangelsdorff-Preis in November 2009. A box set of his 1970s works was released by ECM Records the same month.

Weber's latest albums, Résumé (2012) and Encore (2015) comprise solos from his performances worldwide with The Jan Garbarek Group, overdubbed with keyboards/treatments by Weber, sax by Garbarek, and flügelhorn by Ack Van Rooyen.

His autobiography, Résumé, was published in 2015. An English translation by Heidi Kirk - Eberhard Weber: A German Jazz Story - was published in October 2021.

In 2021, Lyle Mays posthumously released the 13-minute recording Eberhard, revised from a 2009 composition debuted at Lawrence University and written as a tribute to Weber's influential compositional style.  It was awarded a Grammy for Best Instrumental Composition in 2022.

Discography

As leader
 The Colours of Chloë (1974)
 Yellow Fields (1975)
 The Following Morning (1976)
 Silent Feet (1977)
 Fluid Rustle (1979)
 Little Movements (1980)
 Later That Evening (1982)
 Chorus (1984)
 Orchestra (1988)
 Pendulum (1993)
 Endless Days (2001)
 Stages of a Long Journey (2007)
 Résumé (2012)
 Encore (2015)
 Hommage à Eberhard Weber (2015)
 Once Upon a Time (Live in Avignon) (2021)

Compilation albums
 Works (ECM, 1985)
 Rarum: Selected Recordings (ECM, 2004)
 Colours (ECM, 2010) (reissue compiling Yellow Fields, Silent Feet and Little Movements)

As sideman
With Gary Burton
 Ring (ECM, 1974)
 Passengers (ECM, 1976)
With Kate Bush
 The Dreaming (1982)
 Hounds of Love (1985)
 The Sensual World (1989)
 Aerial (2005)
With Jan Garbarek
 Photo with Blue Sky, White Cloud, Wires, Windows and a Red Roof (ECM, 1979)
 Paths, Prints (ECM, 1981)
 Wayfarer (ECM, 1983)
 It's OK to Listen to the Gray Voice (ECM, 1985)
 All Those Born with Wings (ECM, 1987)  
 Legend of the Seven Dreams (ECM, 1988) 	
 I Took Up the Runes (ECM, 1990) 	
 Twelve Moons (ECM, 1992) 		
 Visible World (ECM, 1995)
 Rites (ECM, 1998) 	
With Pat Metheny
 Watercolors (ECM, 1977)
With Ralph Towner
 Solstice (ECM, 1975)
 Solstice/Sound and Shadows (ECM, 1977)
With Mal Waldron
 The Call (JAPO, 1971)

With others
See "External Links" below for a complete discography
 Wolfgang Dauner, Dream Talk (1964), Free Action (1967), Output (1970), The Oimels (1970)
 Hampton Hawes, Hamps' Piano (1967)
 Baden Powell, Poema en Guitar (1968), Solitude on Guitar (1971)
 Joe Pass, Intercontinental (1970)
 Michael Naura, Vanessa (1974) & Call (1975)
 Ernest Ranglin, Ranglypso (1976), MPS
 Stephane Grappelli, Afternoon in Paris (1971)
 The Singers Unlimited with Art Van Damme, Invitation (1973)
 Benny Bailey Islands (1976)
 Manfred Schoof Orchestra, Reflections (1983)
 Graeme Revell, Body of Evidence: Motion Picture Soundtrack (1993)
 United Jazz + Rock Ensemble, including The Break Even Point and United Live Opus Sechs

Literary connections
Weber has, on at least five occasions, drawn on text from the book Watership Down (by Richard Adams) for the names of his compositions and albums. Examples include "Silent Feet" and "Eyes That Can See in the Dark" from the Silent Feet album; "Often in the Open" from the Later That Evening album; and "Quiet Departures" and "Fluid Rustle" on the Fluid Rustle album.

See also
 Electric upright bass

References

External links
 Discography
 Eberhard Weber on ECM Records

20th-century double-bassists
21st-century double-bassists
Chamber jazz double-bassists
Post-bop double-bassists
1940 births
Living people
Musicians from Stuttgart
German jazz double-bassists
Male double-bassists
ECM Records artists
United Jazz + Rock Ensemble members
20th-century German male musicians
21st-century German male musicians
German male jazz musicians